This is a list of listed buildings in Holbæk Municipality, Denmark.

The list

4300 Holbæk

4340 Tølløse

4450 Jyderup

4370 Store Merløse

4390 Vipperød

4420 Regstrup

4440 Mørkøv

4520 Svinninge

References

External links

 Danish Agency of Culture

 
Holbæk